Sminthurinus niger is a species of globular springtails in the family Katiannidae.

References

Collembola